The Australian Film Institute Award for Best Actor in a Supporting Role is an award in the annual Australian Film Institute Awards. It has been awarded annually  since 1974.

Previous winners

References
Afi.org.au — AFI Award Winners

A
AACTA Award winners
Film awards for supporting actor